An election to Longford County Council took place on 23 May 2014 as part of that year's Irish local elections. 18 councillors were elected from three electoral divisions by PR-STV voting for a five-year term of office, a reduction of 3 councillors when compared with 2009. In addition both Granard Town Council and Longford Town Council were abolished.

In one of the party's better local election results, Fine Gael remained the largest party with 8 seats. Fianna Fáil took 7 seats and the remainder were filled by Independents. This was the only Council on which Sinn Féin failed to make a breakthrough.

Results by party

Results by Electoral Area

Ballymahon

Granard

Longford

Changes since 2014
† Longford Fianna Fáil Councillor Padraig Loughrey resigned due to family and work commitments on 22 October 2017. On 14 December 2017 Joe Flaherty was co-opted to fill the vacancy.
†† Granard Fine Gael Councillor John Duffy resigned on 22 February 2018 citing work commitments. On 19 March 2018 Gerry Hagan was co-opted to fill the vacancy.

References

External links
 Official website

2014 Irish local elections
2014